Kerberos Productions Inc. is a video game developer based in Vancouver, British Columbia, Canada. The company was formed in 2003 by former employees of Rockstar Vancouver.

The company takes its name and logo from Cerberus, a large three-headed creature of Greek mythology (Κέρβερος, in Greek).  The three heads of the hellhound represent the three disciplines of game development: art, programming, and design.

The company has released six games: a 4X game called Sword of the Stars (originally published by Lighthouse Interactive, currently published by Paradox Interactive), its sequel Sword of the Stars 2, a role-playing video game titled Fort Zombie, a rogue-like game Sword of the Stars: The Pit, a wargame called Ground Pounders, and an action-strategy game called Kaiju-a-Gogo

Games
 Sword of the Stars (2006)
 Sword of the Stars: Born of Blood (2007) (expansion)
 Sword of the Stars: A Murder of Crows (2008) (expansion)
 Sword of the Stars: Argos Naval Yard (2009) (expansion)
 Fort Zombie (2009)
 Sword of the Stars II: The Lords of Winter (2011) 
 Sword of the Stars: The Pit (2013)
 Ground Pounders (2014)
 Kaiju-a-Gogo (2015)
 NorthStar (TBA)

References

External links
 

Companies based in Vancouver
Canadian companies established in 2003
Video game companies established in 2003
Video game companies of Canada
Video game development companies
2003 establishments in British Columbia